Fat Mattress is the debut self-titled studio album by English folk rock band Fat Mattress, released on 15 August 1969.

Background
Fat Mattress was formed in late-1968 by vocalist Neil Landon and guitarist and vocalist Noel Redding, who was then playing bass with the popular psychedelic rock band The Jimi Hendrix Experience. Landon and Redding had already written a number of songs for Landon's cancelled solo project and, with the recruitment of bassist Jim Leverton and drummer Eric Dillon, completed writing and began recording their first material. The self-titled debut was completed the next year, and was released in the United Kingdom by Polydor Records on 15 August and in the United States by Atco Records in October. In promotion of the album, the band also released their debut single, "Magic Forest", which reached number 11 in the Netherlands.

Fat Mattress was later reissued in 1992 by Sequel Records featuring five new songs, all of which were later included on the 2000 compilation album The Black Sheep of the Family: The Anthology (which also contained three more previously unreleased songs); Castle Communications subsequently re-released the 15-track reissue on 5 March 1996 under the title One. The album was reissued again on 29 June 2009 by Esoteric Recordings with eight bonus tracks, all of which had already appeared on The Black Sheep of the Family anthology.

Reception

The debut album by Fat Mattress was a minor commercial success, charting at number 134 on the American Billboard 200 albums chart (then known as the Pop Albums chart). The album was described, in a review for allmusic, by critic Richie Unterberger as "passable, pleasant late-'60s psychedelia with a far lighter touch than the hard bluesy psychedelic rock Redding played with Hendrix." Unterberger went on to suggest that the album is "often like an amalgam of the Byrds, Buffalo Springfield, Moby Grape, and Love, with some passing nods to British psychedelia by Traffic [...], the Move, and the Small Faces; there's even a bit of a Monkees-go-spacy feel to 'I Don't Mind.'"

Track listing

Personnel

Fat Mattress
Neil Landon – vocals, production
Noel Redding – guitar, vocals, production
Jimmy Leverton – bass, vocals, harpsichord, organ, production
Eric Dillon – drums, tuned percussion, production

Guest musicians
Mitch Mitchell – drums, percussion on "How Can I Live"
Chris Wood – flute on "All Night Drinker"
Jimi Hendrix – percussion on "How Can I Live"

Additional personnel
George Chkiantz – engineering
Gered Mankowitz – photography
Paragon Publicity – sleeve design
Adrian Morgan – liner notes

Release history

References

General

Specific

1969 debut albums
Fat Mattress albums
Polydor Records albums
Atco Records albums
Castle Communications albums
Esoteric Recordings albums
Albums produced by Noel Redding
Albums produced by Neil Landon